Joseph Michael Scally (born December 31, 2002) is an American professional soccer player who plays as a right-back for  club Borussia Mönchengladbach and the United States national team.

Club career

New York City
Scally signed his first professional contract with New York City on March 21, 2018, at the age of 15, and in doing so became the second youngest professional soccer player in the United States, after Freddy Adu. He made his professional debut for New York City in a 4–0 U.S. Open Cup loss to New York Red Bulls on June 6, coming on as a late substitute.

Borussia Mönchengladbach
On November 13, 2019, it was announced that Scally would join Bundesliga side Borussia Mönchengladbach at the end of the 2020 MLS season. On October 2, 2021, he scored his first Bundesliga goal against VfL Wolfsburg in a 3–1 victory.

International career
Scally was a youth international for the United States, representing the United States under-15s and the United States under-17s despite being three years younger than his teammates.

In October 2019, he was named to the squad for the 2019 FIFA U-17 World Cup in Brazil.

In November 2021, he was named to the squad for the senior United States team ahead of their home 2022 FIFA World Cup qualifiers against Mexico and Jamaica. On June 1, 2022, he made his senior debut for the United States in a 3–0 win in a friendly match against Morocco. In November 2022, Scally was named to the 2022 FIFA World Cup squad, but did not appear with the national team.

Career statistics

Club

International

References

External links
 
 Joe Scally  at New York City FC
 Joseph Scally at US Soccer
 Joseph Scally  at US Soccer DA

2002 births
Living people
People from Brookhaven, New York
Sportspeople from Suffolk County, New York
Soccer players from New York (state)
American soccer players
United States men's international soccer players
United States men's youth international soccer players
Association football fullbacks
New York City FC players
Borussia Mönchengladbach II players
Borussia Mönchengladbach players
Major League Soccer players
Homegrown Players (MLS)
Regionalliga players
Bundesliga players
2022 FIFA World Cup players
American expatriate soccer players
American expatriate soccer players in Germany